Gustav Freiherr von Meyern-Hohenberg (10 September 1820 - 1 March 1878) was a German jurist and playwright.

Baron Meyern applied himself to legal studies at the universities of Göttingen and Berlin. In 1843 he took service with Duke Ernest I of Saxe-Coburg and Gotha as appointed Geheimrat and General Intendant of the Coburg court theatre from 1860 to 1868. Meyern was unsuccessful with his dramas, which have vanished into oblivion.

Works 
 Ein Kaiser (1857)
 Heinrich von Schwerin, Schauspiel in 5 Akten (1859)
 Ein Kind des Elsaß, Drama in 2 Akten (1873)
 Das Ehrenwort, Schauspiel in 5 Akten (1873)
 Das Haus Posa, Schauspiel in 5 Akten (1874)
 Die Cavaliere, Schauspiel in 5 Akten (1874)
 Welfenlied (1854), melodized by Henry Litolff

References 

1820 births
1878 deaths
People from Börde (district)
People from the Duchy of Brunswick
Jurists from Saxony-Anhalt
German male dramatists and playwrights
19th-century German dramatists and playwrights
19th-century German male writers
19th-century German writers